The 2017–18 Robert Morris Colonials men's basketball team represented Robert Morris University during the 2017–18 NCAA Division I men's basketball season. The Colonials, led by eighth-year head coach Andrew Toole, played their home games at the PPG Paints Arena and four games at the Palumbo Center in Pittsburgh, Pennsylvania as members of the Northeast Conference. They finished the season 16–17, 9–9 in NEC play to finish in a tie for sixth place. As the No. 7 seed in the NEC tournament, they upset No. 2 seed Mount St. Mary's in the quarterfinals before losing in the semifinals to No. 1 seed Wagner.

On January 30, 2017, Robert Morris announced plans to build a new basketball and volleyball facility named the UPMC Events Center on the school's campus. The basketball team's former home, the Charles L. Sewall Center was to be demolished to make room for the new arena. As a result, the Colonials played their home games at the PPG Paints Arena and at the Palumbo Center on the campus of Duquesne University.

Previous season 
The Colonials finished the 2016–17 season 14–19, 9–9 in NEC play to finish in a three-way tie for fifth place. As the No. 7 seed in the NEC tournament, they defeated LIU Brooklyn in the quarterfinals before losing in the semifinals to Mount St. Mary's.

Preseason 
In a poll of league coaches at the NEC media day, the Colonials were picked to finish in seventh place.

Roster

Schedule and results

|-
!colspan=9 style=| Exhibition

|-
!colspan=9 style=| Non-conference regular season

   
|-
!colspan=9 style=| NEC regular season

|-
!colspan=9 style=| NEC tournament

References

Robert Morris Colonials men's basketball seasons
Robert Morris
Robert Morris
Robert Morris